A liturgical book, or service book, is a book published by the authority of a church body that contains the text and directions for the liturgy of its official religious services.

Christianity

Roman Rite

In the Roman Rite of the Catholic Church, the primary liturgical books are the Roman Missal, which contains the texts of the Mass, and the Roman Breviary, which contains the text of the Liturgy of the Hours. With the 1969 reform of the Roman Missal by Pope Paul VI, now called the "Ordinary Use of the Roman Rite", the Scriptural readings were expanded considerably, requiring a separate book, known as the Lectionary. The Roman Ritual contains the texts of the sacraments other than the Mass, such as baptism, the sacrament of penance, the anointing of the sick, and the sacrament of marriage. The texts for the sacraments and ceremonies only performed by bishops, such as confirmation and Holy Orders, are contained within the Roman Pontifical. The Caeremoniale Episcoporum (The Ceremonial of Bishops) describes in greater detail than the ordinary liturgical books the ceremonies involved when a bishop presides over the celebration of Mass, the celebration of the Liturgy of the Hours or of the Word of God, particular Masses such as Candlemas, Palm Sunday or the Easter Vigil, the other sacraments,  sacramentals, pastoral visitations etc. The Roman Martyrology gives an account of all the saints (not only martyrs) commemorated in the Church each day.

Other Roman-Rite liturgical books include the Roman Gradual and the Gospel Book or Evangeliary.

The Catholic Church is composed of 24 autonomous particular churches, the largest of which is the Latin or Western Church. The other 23 churches are collectively called the Eastern Catholic Churches, and use a variety of liturgical rites such as the Alexandrian Rite, Antiochene Rite, Armenian Rite, Byzantine Rite, and the East Syriac Rite among others.
While the Roman Rite of the Western Church is by far the most common liturgical rite found within the Latin Church, a number of local Western (but not Roman) rites and uses also exist.

Byzantine Rite

The Rite of Constantinople, observed by the Eastern Orthodox Church and those Eastern Catholic Churches which follow the Byzantine Rite, represents one of the most highly developed liturgical traditions in Christendom. While the Roman Catholic Liturgy of the Hours may be published in a single-volume breviary, such a feat is hardly possible for the Byzantine Rite, which requires quite a large library of books to chant the daily services.

The regular services chanted in the Constantinopolitan liturgical tradition are the Canonical Hours and the Divine Liturgy. There are, in addition, occasional services (baptism, confession, etc.) and intercessory or devotional services (molieben, panikhida), which are not chanted on a daily basis, but according to need. The fixed portions of the services are called acolouthia, into which the sequences (changeable portions) are inserted. The sequences can also be referred to as propers

The sequences are governed by the convergence of several liturgical cycles, including the Paschal Cycle (movable cycle, dependent upon the variable date of Easter) and the Menaion (fixed cycle, dependent upon the calendar date).

Acolouthia
The fixed portions of the services are found in the following liturgical books:

Horologion, or Book of Hours, provides the fixed portions of the services as used by the reader and the chanters. For the sake of convenience, some small portions of the sequences are often included as well, such as feast day troparia, kontakia, and those portions which change according to the day of the week. The Horologion may also contain some devotional material such as the Prayers Before Communion, Thanksgiving After Communion, and Morning and Evening Prayers.
Euchologion—Contains the fixed portions of the services which are said by the priest and deacon, as well as some of the variable portions which the clergy use, such as prokeimena and dismissals. The Great Euchologion contains the clergy parts of Vespers, Matins, the three Divine Liturgies, Compline and Midnight Office, the Lenten Hours. It also contains the complete services (including the parts for reader and chanters) for the Sacred Mysteries (Sacraments), Funeral, Monastic Tonsure, Consecration of a Church, and other occasional services. For convenience, the contents of the Great Euchologion in the Slavic tradition have been divided up as follows:
Litourgicon—contains Vespers, Matins and the three Divine Liturgies
Archieratikon—contains the parts of services performed by a bishop
Euchologion—omits the portions contained in the Litourgicon and Archieratikon, and adds other minor acolouthia (such as the blessing of an Iconostasis, Holy Vessels, Vestments, etc.)

Sequences
Into this fixed framework, numerous movable parts of the service are inserted. These are taken from a variety of liturgical books:

Psalter (/, /) – A book containing the 150 Psalms divided into Kathismata together with the Biblical Canticles which are chanted at Matins. The Psalter is used at Vespers and Matins, and normally contains tables for determining which Kathismata are to be read at each service, depending upon the day of the week and the liturgical season of the year.
Octoechos (or) – Literally, the Book of the "Eight Tones"  or modes. This book contains an eight-week cycle, providing texts to be chanted for every day of the week at Vespers, Matins, Compline and (on Sundays) the Midnight Office. Each week, the hymns are sung in a different liturgical Mode or Tone. The origins of this book go back to compositions by St. John Damascene.
Menaion – A twelve-volume set which provides all liturgical texts for each day of the calendar year (including the akrosticha for the Irmologion). The twelve volumes correspond to the months of the year. The liturgical year begins in September, so the first volume of the Menaion is September.
Sticherarion (Greek: , today ) was called a chant book usually with musical notation. It is subdivided in the stichera for the cycle of the fixed feasts according to the yearly cycle between September and August (Menaion). The cycle of mobile feast is subdivided into two books. The first called Triodion contains the stichera sung during Lent and the Holy week, the second called Pentecostarion contains the post-paschal period between Easter and Pentecost, the weekly cycle after Pentecost until the Sunday of All Saints.
Triodion—Also called the Lenten Triodion. During Great Lent the services undergo profound changes. The Lenten Triodion contains propers for:
the Pre-Lenten Season
the Forty Days of Great Lent itself
Lazarus Saturday and Palm Sunday
Holy Week
Pentecostarion (Greek: Πεντηκοστάριον, Pentekostarion; Slavonic: Цвѣтнаѧ Трїωдь, Tsvetnaya Triod' , literally "Flowery Triodon"; Romanian: Penticostar) – This volume contains the propers for the period from Pascha to the Sunday of All Saints. This period can be broken down into the following periods:
Bright Week (Easter Week) – The seven days from the Pascha (Easter Sunday) through the following Saturday
Paschal Season – The period from Thomas Sunday until Ascension
Ascension and its Afterfeast
Pentecost and its Afterfeast
All Saints Sunday (the Sunday after Pentecost)
Synaxarion – The Synaxarion contains brief lives of the saints for each day of the year, usually read at Matins.
Irmologion – Contains the Irmoi chanted at the Canon of Matins and other services.
Gospel Book – Book containing the Gospel readings that are used at Matins, Divine Liturgy, and other services. In the Slavic usage, the  contains the four gospels in canonical order (Matthew, Mark, Luke, John) with annotations in the margin to indicate the beginning and ending of each reading (and an index in the back).
Epistle Book – Contains the readings from the Epistles and the Acts of the Apostles (the Apocalypse is not read during Divine Services in the Orthodox Church). It also contains the Prokeimenon and Alleluia verses that are chanted with the readings.

Other
Typicon—The book which ties all of the above together. It contains all of the rubrics, i.e., the rules for the performance of the Divine Services, giving directions for every possible combination of the materials from the other liturgical books into the Daily Cycle of Services. Many churches also publish annual liturgical calendars which give detailed instructions from the Typicon which are specific to the concurrence of sequences for that particular year.
Anthologion—There are numerous smaller anthologies available, taking portions from the books mentioned above, or from other sources. For instance, the Festal Menaion contains only those portions of the Menaion that have to do with the Great Feasts; and the General Menaion contains propers for each class of saints (with blank spaces for the name of the saint) which may be employed when one does not have the propers for that particular saint; etc.

There are many different editions of these books which have been published over the years in a variety of liturgical languages. In Greek the Orthodox books are published at the Phœnix Press (formerly located in Venice, now at Patras), the Uniate books are published by the Congregation for the Oriental Churches. Each national Church has further its own editions in its liturgical language. There are also books of all kinds which collect and arrange materials from the list of books above into compendiums by various editors. The Uniate compendiums have a natural tendency to imitate the arrangement of the Roman books.

Assyrian
The books of the Church of the East, all in Syriac, are the Liturgy (containing their three liturgies), the Gospel (Evangelion), Apostle (Shlicha) and Lessons (Kariane), the "Turgama" (Interpretation), containing hymns sung by deacons at the liturgy (our Graduals and Sequences), the David (Dawidha = Psalter), "Khudhra" (= "cycle", containing antiphons, responsories, hymns, and collects for all Sundays), "Kash Kõl" (= "Collection of all"; the same chants for week-days), "Kdham u-Wathar" (= "Before and after"; certain prayers, psalms, and collects most often used, from the other books), "Gezza" ("Treasury", services for feast-days), Abu-Halim (the name of the compiler, containing collects for the end of the Nocturns on Sundays), "Bautha d'Ninwaie" (= "Prayer of the Ninevites", a collection of hymns ascribed to St. Ephrem the Syrian, used in Lent). The Baptism Office ("Taksa d'Amadha") is generally bound up with the Liturgies. The "Taksa d'Siamidha" has the ordination services. The "Taksa d'Husaia" contains the office for Penance, the "Kthawa d'Burrakha" is the marriage service, the "Kahneita", the burial of clergy, the "Annidha" that of laymen. Lastly the "Khamis" and "Warda" are further collections of hymns (see Badger, "The Nestorians and their Rituals", London, 1852, II, 16–25). Naturally not every church possesses this varied collection of books. The most necessary ones are printed by the Anglican missionaries at Urmi for the "Nestorian" Christians. The Chaldean Catholic books are printed, some at Propaganda, some by the Dominicans at Mosul ("Missale chaldaicum", 1845; "Manuale Sacerdotum", 1858; "Breviarium chaldaicum", 1865). A Chaldean "Breviary" was published in three vohunes at Paris in 1886–7, edited by Père Bedgan, a missionary of the Congrégation des Missions. The Malabar Christians deemed heretics by Rome use the traditional books of the Church of the East, and the "Uniate" Chaldean Catholics have books revised (much Latinized) by the Synod of Diamper (1599; it ordered all their old books to be burned). The Malabar Catholic "Missal" was published at Rome in 1774, the "Ordo rituum et lectionum" in 1775.

Coptic
The Coptic Books (in Coptic with Arabic rubrics, and generally with the text transliterated in Arabic characters too) are the Euchologion (Kitãb al-Khulagi almuqaddas), very often (but quite wrongly) called Missal. This corresponds to the Byzantine Euchologion. The Coptic equivalent of the Horologion is the Agpeya. Then the Lectionary called Katamãrus; the Synaksãr, containing legends of saints; the "Deacon's Manual"; an Antiphonary (called Difnãri); the Psalter, Theotokia (containing offices of the Virgin Mary); Doxologia; collections of hymns for the choir and a number of smaller books for the various other offices.

The Coptic Orthodox Church has a very sumptuously printed set of their books, edited by Gladios Labib, published at Cairo (Katamãrus, 1900–2; Euchologion, 1904; Funeral Service, 1905).

These books were first grouped and arranged for the Coptic Catholic Church by Raphael Tuki, and printed at Rome in the eighteenth century. Their arrangement is obviously an imitation of that of the Latin service-books (Missale coptice et arabice, 1736; Diurnum alexandrinum copto-arabicum, 1750; Pontificale et Euchologium, 1761, 1762; Rituale coptice et arabice, 1763; Theotokia, 1764). Cyril II, the Uniate Coptic patriarch, published a "missal", "ritual", and "Holy Week book" (Cairo, 1898–1902).

Ethiopian
The Ethiopian service books are, with the exception of the Eucharistic Liturgy (the Missal), the least known of any. Hardly anything of them has been published, and no one seems yet to have made a systematic investigation of liturgical manuscripts in Abyssinia. Since the Ethiopic or Ge'ez Rite is derived from the Coptic, their books correspond more or less to the Coptic books.

Peter the Ethiopian (Petrus Ethyops) published the Liturgy with the baptism service and some blessings at the end of his edition of the Ethiopic New Testament (Tasfa Sion, Rome, 1548). Various students have published fragments of the Rite in Europe (cf. Chaine, "Grammaire éthiopienne", Beirut, 1907; bibliography, p. 269), but these can hardly be called service-books.

Syrian
The Syriac Orthodox (Jacobite) and Catholic-Syrian liturgical books have never been published as a whole. A fragment of the liturgy was published in Syriac and Latin at Antwerp (1572) by Fabricius Boderianus (D. Seven alexandrini . . . de ritibus baptismi et sacræ Synaxis).

The Syrian Catholics have a Euchologion (Syriac and Karshuni), published at Rome in 1843 (Missale Syriacum), and a "Book of clerks used in the ecclesiastical ministries" (Liber ministerii, Syriac only, Beirut, 1888). The Divine Office, collected like a Breviary, was published at Mosul in seven volumes (1886–96), the ferial office alone at Rome in 1853, and at Sharfi in the Lebanon (1898). A Ritual – "Book of Ceremony" – for the Syrian Uniats is issued by the Jesuits at Beirut.

Maronite
The Maronites have an abundance of liturgical books for their divine liturgy. The Maronite Synod at Deir al-Luweize (1736) committed a uniform preparation of all their books to the patriarch (Part II, Sess. I, xiii, etc.) These books are all referred to in Western or Latin terms (Missal, Ritual, Pontifical, etc.). The Missal (in this case the name is not incorrect) was published at Rome in 1592 and 1716, since then repeatedly, in whole or in part, at Beirut. Little books containing the Ordinary of the Liturgy with the Anaphora commonly used are issued by many Catholic booksellers at Beirut. The "Book of the Minister" (containing the deacon's and other ministers' parts of the Liturgy) was published at Rome in 1596 and at Beirut in 1888. The "Ferial Office", called Fard, "Burden" or "Duty" (the only one commonly used by the clergy), was issued at Rome in 1890, at Beirut in 1900. The whole Divine Office began to be published at Rome in 1666, but only two volumes of the summer part appeared. A Ritual with various additional prayers was issued at Rome in 1839. All Maronite books are in Syriac and Karshuni.

Armenian

The Armenian Liturgical Books are quite definitely drawn up, arranged, and authorized. They are the only other set among Eastern Churches whose arrangement can be compared to those of the Byzantines. There are eight official Armenian service-books:
the Directory, or Calendar, corresponding to the Byzantine Typikon,
the Manual of Mysteries of the Sacred Oblation (= a Euchologion),
the Book of Ordinations, often bound up with the former,
the Lectionary,
the Hymn-book (containing the variable hymns of the Liturgy),
the Book of Hours (containing the Divine Office and, generally, the deacon's part of the Liturgy),
the Book of Canticles (containing the hymns of the Office),
the Mashdotz, or Ritual (containing the rites of the sacraments).

The books of both the Armenian Apostolic Church (Oriental-Orthodox) and Armenian Catholic Church  have been published a great number of times; the latest Orthodox editions are those of Constantinople and Jerusalem, the Catholic ones have been issued at Rome, Vienna, and especially Venice (at the Monastery of San Lazaro). There are many extracts from them, especially from the Liturgy.

Lutheran

Martin Luther was in favor of preserving the Mass of the Church and, other than translating it into the vernacular language of the people, he made very few changes to the liturgy.  Over the centuries since the days of the Reformation, the many diverging branches of Lutheran denominations – despite developing a wide swath of differing core beliefs, have maintained and cherished the liturgy and its ancient roots.  Owing to its widespread diaspora of branches, and especially because of the wide variety of regional languages, customs, and beliefs, there have been many different books of Worship prepared and used by congregations worldwide.

Besides the formal liturgy itself, Lutheran worship books usually contain the orders for the minor services during the week, such as Vespers,  Morning Prayer, and Compline, along with large sections of hymns, Psalms, and prayers and other needed information for the correct following of the liturgical calendar.

One particular Lutheran hymnal, used by the Moderate/Liberal Evangelical Lutheran Church in America, the largest Lutheran denomination in the U.S., is Evangelical Lutheran Worship.  The ELW (as it is called) is also used by a few smaller denominations as well, but is mostly frowned upon by more conservative Lutheran bodies, which use their own versions.

Anglican
[[File:The Book of Common Prayer 1662.png|thumb|right|The 1662 Book of Common Prayer, the most widely used Anglican liturgy]]

In the wake of the English Reformation, a reformed liturgy was introduced into the Church of England. The first liturgical book published for general use throughout the church was the Book of Common Prayer (BCP) of 1549, edited by Thomas Cranmer, Archbishop of Canterbury.

The work of 1549 was the first prayer book to contain the forms of service for daily and Sunday worship in English and to do so within a single volume; it included morning prayer, evening prayer, the Litany, and Holy Communion. The book included the other occasional services in full: the orders for baptism, confirmation, marriage, 'prayers to be said with the sick' and a funeral service. It set out in full the Epistle and Gospel readings for the Sunday Communion Service. Set Old Testament and New Testament readings for daily prayer were specified in tabular format as were the set Psalms; and canticles, mostly biblical, that were provided to be sung between the readings. Numerous editions have followed, and currently throughout the Anglican Communion, various Books of Common Prayer are published by the different Anglican provinces.

Other official books are published by the member churches for the official use of their churches, such as the Lectionary, Book of Occasional Services, etc.

Anglo-Catholic
In the late 1800s, as part of the Anglo-Catholic movement, the Anglican Missal was published, to provide a particular way, drawn from the Sarum Use, of celebrating the Eucharist according to Anglican liturgical tradition. Many Anglo-Catholic parishes use the Anglican Missal, or some variation of it such as the English Missal, for the celebration of the Eucharist. Variations include the Anglican Service Book and A Manual of Anglo-Catholic Devotion, and the directive books A Priest's Handbook by Dennis Michno and Ceremonies of the Eucharist by Howard E. Galley. All of these books (with the exception of Manual) are intended primarily for celebration of the Eucharist. They contain meditations for the presiding celebrant(s) during the liturgy, and other material such as the rite for the blessing of palms on Palm Sunday, propers for special feast days, and instructions for proper ceremonial order. These books are used as a more expansively Catholic context in which to celebrate the liturgical use found in the BCP and related liturgical books.

Methodist
John Wesley, the Anglican priest who was a principal leader of the early Methodist revival, wrote that  When the Methodists in America were separated from the Church of England because of the American Revolution, John Wesley himself provided a revised version of the Book of Common Prayer called the Sunday Service of the Methodists in North America. Wesley's Sunday Service has shaped the official liturgies of the Methodists ever since. For this reason, Methodist liturgy is decidedly Anglican in its character, though Methodists have generally allowed for more flexibility and freedom in how the liturgy is celebrated than is typical of Anglican churches.

Today, the primary liturgical books of the United Methodist Church are The United Methodist Hymnal and The United Methodist Book of Worship, along with their non-English counterparts. The British Methodist Church uses The Methodist Worship Book. These service books contain written liturgy that is generally derived from Wesley's Sunday Service and from the 20th Century liturgical renewal movement. They also contain the hymnody of the Methodist Church, which has always been an important part of Methodist worship.

Presbyterian
Presbyterianism's first liturgical book is the Book of Common Order, which was written by the denomination's founder, John Knox. The book was published first in Geneva in 1556 under the title Forme of Prayers and was written for use by that city's English Reformed congregation. In 1562 it was adopted by the Church of Scotland, which had been founded two years earlier, and in 1567 was translated into Scottish Gaelic as Foirm na n-Urrnuidheadh for use in the Highlands by Séon Carsuel (John Carswell).

In 1645, the Church of Scotland adopted the Directory for Public Worship, which was written by the Westminster Assembly and intended for use in England, Scotland, and Ireland. It was never translated into Scottish Gaelic.

Since 1906, Presbyterians in the United States have used their own liturgical book, the Book of Common Worship. Its most recent edition was published in 1993.

Other religions
 Confucianism
 The Book of Rites ("Liji")
 The Book of Etiquette and Ceremonial ("Yili")
 Shinto
 The  is a book about laws and customs, including liturgical texts
 Tenrikyo
 The Mikagura-uta'' ("The Songs for the Service")

See also

Notes

References

Sources

External links

Catholic Encyclopedia article

Books by type
Prayer books
Christian religious objects
Catholic liturgical books
Eastern Christian liturgical objects

Lutheran liturgy and worship